The LSWR T3 class was a class of express passenger 4-4-0 steam locomotives designed for the London and South Western Railway by William Adams. Twenty were constructed between 1892–1893.

The class were numbered 557–576, and had been intended as a variant of the X2 class with slightly smaller driving wheels ( versus ).

All passed to the Southern Railway at the grouping in 1923. Withdrawals started in 1930, and by the end of 1933 only three remained. No. 557 went in 1936, 571 in 1943, and the last, 563 was retired in August 1945 and set aside for preservation, at which point it had run 1.5 million miles.  From May to October 2011 it was in Toronto, Ontario, on loan for use in a theatrical production of The Railway Children at Roundhouse Park, a role it reprised from December 2014 to January 2017 when the production was staged at King's Cross, London.

On 30 March 2017, No. 563 was transferred to the Swanage Railway Trust. The locomotive has now moved permanently to the Swanage Railway with a formal handover ceremony held at Corfe Castle on Saturday 27 May. Following an individual donation, the Swanage Railway declared their intention to explore the possibility of restoring the locomotive to working order, with a public appeal for additional funds being launched in October 2017.  The evaluation was positive and a full restoration programme is currently under way, with a target of returning to operation in 2023.

References

External links
 LSWR T3 class SRemG
 LSWR T3 No.563 Swanage Railway

T03
4-4-0 locomotives
Railway locomotives introduced in 1892
Standard gauge steam locomotives of Great Britain